Henry Alexander Cooper (12 June 1853 – 16 August 1899) born in Norton-on-Derwent, East Riding of Yorkshire, England, was a 19th-century celebrity billed by P. T. Barnum as The Tallest Man in the World.

References

External links
 
 article

1853 births
1899 deaths
Ringling Bros. and Barnum & Bailey Circus
People from Norton-on-Derwent
19th-century English people
Sideshow performers
People with gigantism